Colin Bilek (born June 4, 1997) is an American professional ice hockey right wing currently playing with the  Rockford IceHogs of the American Hockey League (AHL). He previously played collegiate hockey with the United States Military Academy. He was an All-American for Army.

Playing career
Bilek began his college career in 2018 with little fanfare. The undrafted forward signed on with the Army Black Knights, a program that typically serves as the last final chapter in a young player's career before moving on to a different professional career. Bilek spent his first two seasons providing moderate offensive numbers. He game showed a small improvement as a sophomore despite having his season cut short due to the COVID-19 pandemic. He was named team captain entering his junior season and Bilek responded with a tremendous offensive outburst. While playing eleven fewer games, he more than doubled his goal production, finishing among the national leaders with 18 markers in just 22 games. The stunning performance earned his a spot on the All-American team and put the Black Knights in a position to earn a NCAA Tournament bid for the first time. Unfortunately, Army fell in the conference semifinals and were ultimately left out of the bracket.

On July 27, 2022, Bilek embarked on his professional career after signing a one-year AHL contract with the Manitoba Moose, the primary affiliate to the Winnipeg Jets. In the 2022–23 season, Bilek was initially assigned to make his professional debut with ECHL club, Trois-Rivières Lions. He was later recalled to the Moose and featured in 2 games for the club before returning to the Lions. Bilek added 14 goals and 23 points in 45 games with Trois-Rivières before he was traded by the Moose to the Rockford IceHogs for future considerations and immediately assigned to continue in the ECHL with the Indy Fuel on February 27, 2023.

Career statistics

Awards and honors

References

External links

1997 births
Living people
American men's ice hockey right wingers
Ice hockey people from Michigan
People from Brighton, Michigan
AHCA Division I men's ice hockey All-Americans
Army Black Knights men's ice hockey players
Indy Fuel players
Manitoba Moose players
Trois-Rivières Lions players